The Cézanne Affair is a 2009 Italian comedy drama film written, directed and starred by Sergio Rubini. For her performance in the film, the actress Valeria Golino was nominated in the category for best  actress at the Nastro d'Argento Awards.

Plot 
The plot of the film is a flashback by Gabriele Rossetti, a young teacher who returns to Bari for the death of his father Ernesto.
Ernesto Rossetti was the stationmaster in the small Apulian village of San Vito dei Normanni. He lived happily with his wife and his little son, Gabriele. However, Ernesto had artistic ambitions and was fond of Paul Cézanne's painting after he saw the artist's water colour self-portrait at Bari. Ernesto wanted to make an exhibition in his homage to the country, but the local art critic, truncated and conceited, stunned the exhibition with a newspaper article.Ernesto did not win for himself. He copied to Cézanne's work, neglecting the family especially Gabriele, who began to grow afraid of him and hate him. On the birthday of his son, Ernesto showed the professor (local art critic) the new picture; and the professor again negatively commented the work, stirring up Ernesto's wrath, giving an inconvenient shock to his son Gabriele. When Gabriele grew up, he eventually discovered that Ernesto had deceived everyone with the second painting, which he replaced with the original painting of Paul Cézanne, in order to prove the deceit of the villagers and the professor.

Cast 
Sergio Rubini as Ernesto Rossetti
Valeria Golino as Franca 
Riccardo Scamarcio as Pinuccio 
 Guido Giaquinto as Gabriele Rossetti  
Anna Falchi as Donna Valeria Giordano
Mario Maranzana as Museum Director  
 Vito Signorile as Professor Venusio
Maurizio Micheli as Lawyer Pezzetti
Mariolina De Fano as Mrs. Lo Turco
Fabrizio Gifuni as Gabriele Rossetti (Adult) 
Margherita Buy as Anna

References

External links 

2009 comedy-drama films
2009 films
Italian comedy-drama films
Films directed by Sergio Rubini
Films scored by Nicola Piovani
2000s Italian films